Incidente em Varginha  (also released as The Varginha Incident  and Alien Anarchy) is a 1998 Brazilian first-person shooter game developed by Perceptum. The game is based on the Varginha UFO incident, in which three people claimed to have seen an alien in the city of Varginha, Brazil.

Development 
Incidente em Varginha was designed by Marcos Cuzziol (software engineer), Odair Gaspar (industrial engineer and programmer) and Fábio Cardelli (sound designer). The game was announced in a press release on 10/09/98. After release, Perceptum signed an agreement with U.S. Special Forces training center and NovaLogic in order to use the software to train Delta Force soldiers.

Critical reception and legacy 
Two thousand copies were sold in Brazil and 20,000 in the rest of the world.

The game has a legacy of being Brazil's first FPS.

References

External links 
 Incidente em Varginha at Mobylist

1998 video games
DOS games
DOS-only games
First-person shooters
Video games about extraterrestrial life
Video games developed in Brazil
Video games set in Brazil
Sprite-based first-person shooters
3D GameStudio games